Srednja Vas pri Dragi (or Mittergraß) is a village southeast of Draga in the Municipality of Loški Potok in southern Slovenia. The area is part of the traditional region of Lower Carniola and is now included in the Southeast Slovenia Statistical Region. The settlement includes the hamlet of Šafarje.

Name
The name of the settlement was changed from Srednja vas to Srednja vas pri Dragi in 1953.

References

External links
Srednja Vas pri Dragi on Geopedia
Pre–World War II list of oeconyms and family names in Srednja Vas pri Dragi

Populated places in the Municipality of Loški Potok